TravelPod was an online service owned by TripAdvisor which allowed users to create travel blogs. According to TravelPod, it was the first website to offer this free service when it was founded by Luc Levesque in 1997, who claims to have pioneered the concept of the travel blog, which is also known as a travelogue or travel journal. 
In late 2005, TravelPod enabled its users to submit photos by mobile phone devices, also known as moblogging. TravelPod allowed travellers to notify family, friends and other travellers whenever they update their blog. TravelPod also gave its members the possibility to password-protect their blog.

TravelPod also created a game called Traveler IQ Challenge, where players must quickly and as accurately as possible, identify cities and places on a map, with increasing levels of difficulty.  There is the original World Challenge, and many other regional challenges.  TravelPod and Facebook users could also create their own customized challenges.  Traveller IQ increased web traffic to TravelPod's website, and the game was also popular on Facebook.

Membership reached 20,000 members in November, 2005. TravelPod has received positive press from the following publications The Wall Street Journal, The New York Times, National Geographic Magazine and PC Magazine.

In 2017 TravelPod announced that they have closed down their site. Users of TravelPod may have been archived at TravelArk.

References

External links 
 TravelPod.com

Tripadvisor
American travel websites
Internet properties established in 1997
Internet properties disestablished in 2017